
Patney is a small village and civil parish in Wiltshire, England, in the Vale of Pewsey about  south-east of Devizes.

The infant Salisbury Avon forms part of the southern boundary of the parish.

Religious sites
The nearest Anglican church is St John the Baptist at Chirton. Patney had a church since the 12th century, St Swithin's, which was rebuilt in 1878, closed in 1992, and became a private residence in 1996.

The ecclesiastical parish was united with the benefice of Chirton with Marden in 1963, and today is within the area of the Cannings and Redhorn Team Ministry which covers a group of eight churches in the Vale of Pewsey.

Local government
All significant local government services are provided by Wiltshire Council, with its headquarters in Trowbridge, and the parish is represented there by Paul Oatway, who succeeded Brigadier Robert Hall as the councillor for Pewsey Vale West in 2013. In the House of Commons the parish is part of the Devizes constituency.

Railway

The Stert and Westbury Railway was built close to the north of the village in 1900 by the Great Western Railway Company. There was a station where the road to All Cannings crossed the line; it was closed when local services were withdrawn in 1966.

References

External links
 
 

Villages in Wiltshire
Civil parishes in Wiltshire